Gianandrea Noseda (born 23 April 1964, Sesto San Giovanni, Italy) is an Italian conductor.

Biography
Noseda studied piano and composition in Milan.  He began conducting studies at age 27.  He furthered his conducting studies with Donato Renzetti, Myung-Whun Chung and Valery Gergiev.  His professional conducting debut was in 1994 with the Orchestra Sinfonica di Milano Giuseppe Verdi.

In 1994, Noseda won the Cadaqués Orchestra International Conducting Competition and became principal conductor of the Cadaqués Orchestra in the same year.  He became principal guest conductor at the Mariinsky Theatre in St Petersburg in 1997.  He has also served as principal guest conductor of the Rotterdam Philharmonic Orchestra and artistic director of the Settimane Musicali di Stresa e del Lago Maggiore Festival in Italy.  In 2001, he became artistic director of the Stresa Festival in Italy.  In 2007, Noseda became Music Director of the Teatro Regio di Torino.  Noseda led the Teatro Regio di Torino on its first North American tour in December 2014.  In April 2018, Noseda submitted his resignation from the Teatro Regio music directorship.

In December 2001, Noseda was named principal conductor of the BBC Philharmonic, and assumed the post in September 2002.  In July 2003, Noseda extended his contract with the orchestra to 2008.   He and the BBC Philharmonic participated in a 2005 BBC Radio 3 project which made live performances in Manchester of the nine symphonies of Beethoven available for download.  In October 2006, Noseda extended his contract for another two years and his title was changed to Chief Conductor.  He concluded his BBC Philharmonic tenure after the 2010–2011 season and subsequently took the title of conductor laureate.  In February 2016, the London Symphony Orchestra announced the appointment of Noseda as its new co-principal guest conductor, effective with the 2016–2017 season.

Outside of the UK, Noseda held the Victor de Sabata Guest Conductor Chair with the Pittsburgh Symphony Orchestra, for a designated term of 4 seasons.  He has served as principal guest conductor of the Israel Philharmonic since May 2011.  In 2011, Noseda first guest-conducted the National Symphony Orchestra (NSO; Washington, D.C.), and returned in November 2015 for an additional guest engagement.  In January 2016, the NSO appointed Noseda as its next music director, effective with the 2017–2018 season, with an initial contract of 4 seasons.  In September 2018, the NSO announced the extension of Noseda's contract through the 2024–2025 season.  In June 2022, the NSO announced a further extension of Noseda's contract through the 2026–2027 season.

Noseda first conducted at Zürich Opera in May 2017, in a production of Prokofiev's The Fiery Angel, and subsequently returned for a further guest engagement with Verdi's Macbeth.  In July 2018, Zürich Opera announced the appointment of Noseda as its next Generalmusikdirektor, effective in 2021.  In October 2022, Zürich Opera announced an extension of Noseda's contract with the company through the 2027-2028 season.

Noseda has conducted several recordings with the BBC Philharmonic for the Chandos label, of Prokofiev, Dallapiccola (including the world premiere recording of Dallapiccola's Partita), Dvořák, Liszt, Karłowicz, Casella, Shostakovich, Rachmaninoff, and Respighi.

Noseda holds the honour of Cavaliere Ufficiale al Merito della Repubblica Italiana, for his contributions to the artistic life of Italy.  He was the recipient of the 'Conductor of the Year' award from Musical America, for 2015.

References

External links
 Official website of Gianandrea Noseda
 National Symphony Orchestra page on Gianandrea Noseda
 Artists Management Company Ltd agency page on Gianandrea Noseda

Noseda,Gianandrea
Musicians from Milan
1964 births
Living people
Milan Conservatory alumni
21st-century Italian conductors (music)
21st-century Italian male musicians
National Symphony Orchestra